Hebrew Cemetery may refer to:

Hebrew Cemetery (Richmond, Virginia), listed on the National Register of Historic Places (NRHP) in Virginia
Hebrew Cemetery (Jackson, Michigan), listed on the NRHP in Jackson County, Michigan
 Hebrew Cemetery (Cascade County, Montana), one of Cascade County's cemeteries
 Marysville Hebrew Cemetery, Marysville, Yuba County, California
 Sonora Hebrew Cemetery, Sonora, Tuolumne County, California